"Al-Damad" Ahmad Nami or "Damat" Ahmet Nami (1873 – 13 December 1962) was an Ottoman prince (damat), the fifth prime minister of Syria and second president of Syria (1926–28), and a lecturer of history and politics.

Early life
Ahmad Nami was born in 1873 in Beirut to an affluent family related to the Ottoman dynasty. He was of Turkish and Circassian origin, and his father Fakhri Bey was governor of Beirut during the Ottoman rule.

Nami studied in the Ottoman Military Academy and received military training in Paris. He married Ayşe Sultan, the daughter of Sultan Abdul Hamid II in 1910. By 1909, the family were forced into exile in France when Nami's father-in-law, the Sultan, was overthrown from his throne by the Young Turks. Nami moved back to Beirut in 1918 where he administered his family’s enterprises.

In July 1920, the French officers in the region delegated Nami to form a government in Syria and gave him limited presidential powers. By April 26, 1926, Nami created his official cabinet and appointed Husni al-Barazi as Minister of Interior, Faris al-Khury as Minister of Education, and Lutfi al-Haffar as Minister of Commerce. However, in June 1926 the ministers all resigned from their posts to protest the French policies toward their nationalist movement; they were then arrested by the French High Commissioner of the Levant Henry de Jouvenel. Nami sought to secure their release but was threatened by imprisonment, causing him to replace his cabinet with three pro-French politicians.

Nami worked relentlessly against the establishment of a separate Lebanon and promoted the historical boundaries to preserve Syrian unity (Greater Syria). He also sought to have a national army and requested entry into the League of Nations. Moreover, he demanded that the French compensate citizens whose homes had been destroyed during the Great Syrian Revolt of 1925–27, and also asked for a general amnesty to permit the return of Syrian exiles. However, the authorities in Paris objected to Nami’s ambitions and accused him of establishing a monarchy. Consequently, he was removed from the office on February 8, 1928.

In 1932, the French reconsidered creating a throne in Syria and appointing Nami as the king, though this plan never came to light. He was then considered a possible candidate for presidential office in 1940. However, the National Bloc objected to his leadership.

Retirement
Nami retired from public life and moved to Lebanon in the 1940s. He occasionally travelled to France as a visiting lecturer on history and politics at the Sorbonne University.

Personal life
Nami had two sons from his marriage with the Ottoman princess Ayşe Sultan: Ömer Nami Osmanoğlu and Osman Nami Osmanoğlu. 
  
He died on 13 December 1962.

References

Bibliography

Syrian people of Turkish descent
Lebanese people of Turkish descent
Syrian people of Circassian descent
Politicians from Beirut
Presidents of Syria
1873 births
1962 deaths
20th-century Syrian politicians
Freemasons
Damats
Syrian Freemasons